The United Transport Administration was the transport agency of Georgia from 2005 to 2011, which united the management of road transport, civil aviation and maritime transport in the country. The agency was subordinated first to the Ministry of Economy and Sustainable Development and then to the Ministry of Regional Development and Infrastructure. The agency had its head office in Tbilisi.

In February 2011, the United Transport Administration was split into the agencies for Road Transport, Civil Aviation and Maritime Transport, each of which is a separate legal entity under the overall supervision of the Ministry of Economy and Sustainable Development.

Divisions
Divisions included:
Civil Aviation Department (სამოქალაქო ავიაციის დეპარტამენტი)
Maritime Transport Department (საზღვაო ტრანსპორტის დეპარტამენტი)
Road Transport Department (საავტომობილო ტრანსპორტის დეპარტამენტი)

References

External links

United Transport Administration
United Transport Administration 

Government of Georgia (country)
Civil aviation authorities in Asia
Civil aviation in Georgia (country)
Government agencies established in 2005
Government agencies disestablished in 2011
2005 establishments in Georgia (country)
Transport organisations based in Georgia (country)